Martin Štěpánek (born 13 December 1979) is a tennis coach and former professional player from the Czech Republic.

Biography
The son of teachers, Blanka and Ludek Štěpánek, he was born in Havana, Cuba. He also lived in Mexico growing up in the 1980s.

Štěpánek, who is not related to Radek Štěpánek, has one brother.

Playing career
At an ITF Futures event in the Czech Republic in 2001, Štěpánek had a win over Tomáš Berdych in what was the future world number four's first appearance on tour.

In 2003 he won the Mordovia Cup, a tournament on the ATP Challenger circuit.

He won eight Challenger doubles titles, five of them in 2005, a year he reached a career high 102 in the world.

Coaching
A shoulder injury ended his career at the end of the 2005 season and he made the move into coaching.

Based in Prague, he is best known as the coach of Croatian player Ivan Dodig. During their time together, Dodig made it to 29 in the world in singles and 4 in doubles.

He has also coached Lukáš Dlouhý to two Grand Slam doubles titles and worked with Frederico Gil when he was a coach at the Break Point Academy in Halle, Germany.

Since 2018 he was the coach of Tomáš Berdych until his retirement in 2019.

He started coaching Borna Ćorić at the end of 2019 till 2022. 

He is currently coaching Sebastian Korda.

Challenger titles

Singles: (1)

Doubles: (8)

References

External links
 
 

1979 births
Living people
Czech male tennis players
Czech tennis coaches
Tennis players from Prague
Sportspeople from Havana